This is a comprehensive discography of official recordings by Eve 6, an American rock band from La Crescenta, California. They have released four albums and one EP, of which 1.5 million copies have been certified by the RIAA.

Albums

Studio albums

Live albums

Extended plays

Singles

B-sides and other appearances

Music videos

Notes

References

Eve 6
Discographies of American artists
Rock music group discographies